Civís is a village in the municipality of Les Valls de Valira, in Catalonia, Spain, located to the west of Aixàs and Bixessarri (Andorra) and near Os de Civís.

References

Towns in Spain
Populated places in Alt Urgell